Evelina Georgieva Nikolova (born 18 January 1993, Petrich) is a Bulgarian freestyle wrestler. She won one of the bronze medals in the women's 57 kg event at the 2020 Summer Olympics held in Tokyo, Japan. She won a bronze medal at the 2015 World Wrestling Championships held in Las Vegas, United States. She is also a three-time medalist at the European Wrestling Championships and a bronze medalist at the European Games.

Career 

She represented Bulgaria at the 2015 European Games held in Baku, Azerbaijan and she won one of the bronze medals in the 55 kg event. In that same year, she also won a bronze medal in the 55 kg event at the 2015 World Wrestling Championships held in Las Vegas, United States. In her bronze medal match she defeated Pang Qianyu of China.

At the 2019 European Wrestling Championships held in Bucharest, Romania, she won the silver medal in the 55 kg event. In the final, she lost against Iryna Husyak of Ukraine. In 2020, she competed in the 55 kg event at the European Wrestling Championships where she was eliminated from the competition by Sofia Mattsson in her first match. Mattsson went on to win one of the bronze medals.

In March 2021, she qualified at the European Qualification Tournament to compete at the 2020 Summer Olympics in Tokyo, Japan. A month later, she won one of the bronze medals in the 57 kg event at the 2021 European Wrestling Championships held in Warsaw, Poland. At the 2020 Summer Olympics, she won her first match, against Jowita Wrzesień of Poland, in the women's 57 kg event and she also won her next match against Anastasia Nichita of Moldova. She then lost in the semi-finals against Iryna Kurachkina of Belarus. In her bronze medal match she defeated Valeria Koblova representing the Russian Olympic Committee. In October 2021, she was eliminated in her second match in the women's 57 kg event at the World Wrestling Championships in Oslo, Norway.

In February 2022, she won the gold medal in the 57 kg event at the Dan Kolov & Nikola Petrov Tournament held in Veliko Tarnovo, Bulgaria. In that same month, she won the gold medal in her event at the Yasar Dogu Tournament held in Istanbul, Turkey. In April 2022, she won the silver medal in the 57 kg event at the European Wrestling Championships held in Budapest, Hungary. She competed in the 57kg event at the 2022 World Wrestling Championships held in Belgrade, Serbia.

On October 28, 2022, at a solemn meeting of the Municipal Council - Petrich, Evelina Nikolova, along with six other prominent citizens of Petrich, was awarded the title of Honorary Citizen of Petrich.

Achievements

References

External links 

 

Living people
1993 births
Bulgarian female sport wrestlers
World Wrestling Championships medalists
European Wrestling Championships medalists
European Games medalists in wrestling
European Games bronze medalists for Bulgaria
Wrestlers at the 2015 European Games
People from Petrich
Wrestlers at the 2020 Summer Olympics
Olympic wrestlers of Bulgaria
Medalists at the 2020 Summer Olympics
Olympic bronze medalists for Bulgaria
Olympic medalists in wrestling
Sportspeople from Blagoevgrad Province
21st-century Bulgarian women